Saperda bilineatocollis is a species of beetle in the family Cerambycidae. It was described by Maurice Pic in 1924. It is known from Russia and China.

References

bilineatocollis
Beetles described in 1924